The Holdfast Bay railway line was a railway in western Adelaide. The line started in the city from the Adelaide railway station, and then headed west. From approximately where Henley Beach Road currently is, the railway then followed an almost direct route to the seaside suburb of Glenelg.

Today, much of the corridor in which the line ran remains as a rail trail for cyclists, which is known as the Westside Bikeway. Part of the north section of the corridor has been built over as James Congdon Drive. A railway platform remains on the site of Plympton station near Marion Road in the suburb of Plympton. The line was closed in 1929, after which remnants remained for some time including rails across Marion Road in the 1950s. A signal from the line was preserved and put in the main pavilion of the National Railway Museum, Port Adelaide.

History 

The line was constructed to compete with the existing Glenelg railway line, (now the Glenelg tram line), which ran from Victoria Square. Customer satisfaction on the existing line was becoming low. In response a group which had been attempting to improve conditions on the existing service decided to establish a company and construct a new railway in competition with the existing one.

The Holdfast Bay Railway Company was established and the new line was opened on 24 May 1880 with a depot at St Leonards (now in the suburb of Glenelg North). Trips took only 20 minutes to Glenelg, 5 minutes shorter than the existing line. There were two trains that ran in the morning from Glenelg to Adelaide, and two from Adelaide to Glenelg in the afternoon. The company ran services from the existing Adelaide railway station, paying a fee to use the portion of track owned by the South Australian Railways (SAR) between Adelaide and Mile End stations, with the line branching off just before Mile End station.

Less than a year after the line opened, it was realised there was not enough business to support both companies. On 11 May 1882, the two merged to form the Glenelg Railway Company. A connecting line was laid along Brighton Road with both lines continuing to run services. Business assets such as maintenance facilities were shared to reduce costs, and the South Terrace depot was consequently closed. The Holdfast Bay line was the less profitable of the two, partly due to excessive charges by the SAR for use of its line. Attempts to close the line met with strong opposition as it was argued closure would isolate Glenelg from the rest of the State. To overcome this it was proposed to lay in a connection at Goodwood.

The Glenelg Railway Company was acquired by the SAR and steam services continued, with the Holdfast Bay line duplicated from Mile End to St Leonards by 1914, with raised platforms being provided at most stations. A branch line running across Bay Road (now Anzac Highway) was constructed to provide services to Morphettville Racecourse, though it did not make a connection with the other rail line.

In 1924, William A. Webb, the railways commissioner, proposed that the two Glenelg railways be given to the Municipal Tramways Trust (MTT) and be converted from steam railways into electric tramways. The government, following Mr Webb's recommendation, acquired both railways and electrification of the Glenelg railway line (now the Glenelg tram) began in 1929, taking nine months to finish. On the day when the Glenelg line conversion was completed in December 1929, South Australian Railways stopped running trains on the Holdfast Bay line. After the closure, the MTT began the operation of bus services from the city to Plympton.

The Holdfast Bay line was originally intended to become electrified with the Glenelg line, and small scale works on its conversion had begun, including drilling holes for power lines. However, with the onset of the Great Depression, conversion works were halted and steam services did not resume. Parts of the remaining corridor, primarily beyond Camden station, were sold to private holders in 1938, and the remainder to the South Australian Government in 1940. The MATS Plan in the 1960s proposed an expressway be constructed in the corridor.

See also 
 Railways in Adelaide
 List of Adelaide railway stations
 List of closed Adelaide railway stations

Notes

References
J.C. Radcliff. C.J.M. Steele,  Adelaide Road Passenger Transport 1836–1958 , Libraries Board of South Australia, Adelaide, 1974

Closed railway lines in South Australia
Railway lines opened in 1880
Railway lines closed in 1929